This is a list of irregular verbs in the English language.

Past tense irregular verbs

For each verb listed, the citation form (the bare infinitive) is given first, with a link to the relevant Wiktionary entry. This is followed by the simple past tense (preterite), and then the past participle. If there are irregular present tense forms (see below), these are given in parentheses after the infinitive. (The present participle and gerund forms of verbs, ending in -ing, are always regular. In English, these are used as verbs, adjectives, and nouns.) In the case of modal verbs the present and preterite forms are listed, since these are the only forms that exist with the present form identical for all persons.

The right-hand column notes whether the verb is weak or strong and whether it belongs to a subclass, and links to descriptions elsewhere. Information about the development of these verbs generally can be found at English irregular verbs; details of the etymology and usage of specific verbs can be found by consulting Wiktionary.

In some cases, there are two or more possibilities for a given form. In the table, the preferred or more common usage is generally listed first, though for some words the usage is nearly equal for the two choices. Sometimes the usage depends on the dialect. In many cases, such as spell (spelt vs. spelled), learn (learnt vs. learned), and spill (spilt vs. spilled), American English normally uses the regular form, while British English tends to favor the irregular. In other cases, such as dive (dived vs. dove) and sneak (sneaked vs. snuck), the opposite is true. Australian, New Zealand and South African English tend to follow the British practice, while Canadian English often sides with the American usage. It is also worth noting that the irregular form tends to indicate duration, whereas the regular form often describes a short-term action (The fire burned for weeks. vs. He burnt his finger.), and in American English, the regular form is associated with the literal sense of a verb, while the irregular form with a figurative one.

The preterite and past participle forms of irregular verbs follow certain patterns. These include ending in -t (e.g. build, bend, send), stem changes (whether it is a vowel, such as in sit, win or hold, or a consonant, such as in teach and seek, that changes), or adding the [n] suffix to the past participle form (e.g. drive, show, rise). English irregular verbs are now a closed group, which means that newly formed verbs are always regular and do not adopt any of the irregular patterns.

This list only contains verb forms which are listed in the major dictionaries as being standard usage in modern English. There are also many thousands of archaic, non-standard and dialect variants. Modern English still has remnants of formerly irregular verbs in other parts of speech. Most obviously, adjectives like clean-shaven, beholden, or forlorn fossilize what are originally the past participles of the verbs shave and behold, and Old English forleosan. However, forleosan has fallen out of use and shave is now regular, so these verbs are not listed, and behold, while still irregular, can no longer be listed this participle form.

{| class="wikitable sortable"
! Verb forms !! Verb class and notes
|- valign="top"
| be (am, is, are) – was, were – been
| Suppletive. See Indo-European copula.
|-valign=top
|bear – bore – borne/born
forbear – forbore/forbare – forborne/forborn
overbear – overbore/overbare – overborne/overborn
underbear – underbore/underbare – underborne/underborn
| Strong, class 4. The spelling born is used in passive or adjectival contexts relating to birth.
|-valign=top
|beat – beat – beaten/beat
browbeat – browbeat – browbeaten/browbeat
overbeat – overbeat – overbeaten/overbeat
| Strong, class 7
|-valign=top
|become – became – become
misbecome – misbecame – misbecome
| Strong, class 4
|-valign=top
|beget – begot/begat – begot/begotten
misbeget – misbegot/misbegat – misbegotten/misbegot
| Strong, class 5
|-valign=top
|begin – began – begun
| Strong, class 3
|-valign=top
|bend – bent – bent
overbend – overbent – overbent
unbend – unbent – unbent
| Weak, class 1, with coalescence of dentals and devoiced ending
|-valign=top
|beseech – beseeched/besought – beseeched/besought
| Weak, class 1, subclass (ii), with Rückumlaut and Germanic spirant law (now regularized)
|-valign=top
|bet – bet/betted – bet/betted
underbet – underbet/underbetted – underbet/underbetted
| Weak with coalescence of dentals
|-valign=top
|beware – (no other forms)
| Defective; formed from be with predicate adjective, used as infinitive, imperative and subjunctive only. Inflected forms (bewares, bewared, bewaring) are considered obsolete.
|-valign=top
|bid [in auctions etc.] – bid – bid
outbid – outbid – outbid
overbid – overbid – overbid
rebid – rebid – rebid
underbid – underbid – underbid
| Weak with coalescence of dentals
|-valign=top
|bid [meaning to request or say] – bid/bade – bid/bidden
| Strong, class 5
|-valign=top
|bide – bided/bode – bided/bidden
| Strong, class 1
|-valign=top
|bind – bound – bound
unbind – unbound – unbound
| Strong, class 3
|-valign=top
|bite – bit – bitten
|Strong, class 1
|-valign=top
|bleed – bled – bled
| Weak, class 1, with vowel shortening and coalescence of dentals
|-valign=top
|blend – blended – blended
| Weak with devoiced ending (or regular)
|-valign=top
|bless – blessed/blest – blessed/blest
| Weak, regular with alternative (archaic) spelling
|-valign=top
|blow – blew – blown
overblow – overblew – overblown
| Strong, class 7
|-valign=top
|break – broke – broken
outbreak – outbroke – outbroken
rebreak – rebroke – rebroken
| Strong, class 4
|-valign=top
|breed – bred – bred
inbreed – inbred – inbred
interbreed – interbred – interbred
overbreed – overbred – overbred
| Weak, class 1, with vowel shortening and coalescence of dentals
|-valign=top
|bring – brought – brought
| Weak, class 1, subclass (i), with Rückumlaut and Germanic spirant law. 
|-valign=top
|build – built – built
overbuild – overbuilt – overbuilt
rebuild – rebuilt – rebuilt
underbuild – underbuilt – underbuilt
| Weak, class 1, with coalescence of dentals and devoiced ending
|-valign=top
|burn – burned/burnt – burned/burnt
sunburn – sunburned/sunburnt – sunburned/sunburnt
| Weak with devoiced ending (or regular)
|-valign=top
|burst – burst – burst| Strong, class 3
|-valign=top
|bust – busted/bust – busted/bust| Strong, class 3 (or regular)
|-valign=top
|buy – bought – boughtoverbuy – overbought – overboughtunderbuy – underbought – underbought| Weak, class 1, subclass (ii), with Rückumlaut and Germanic spirant law
|-valign=top
|can [auxiliary verb] – could – (none)
| Preterite-present, defective. See English modal verbs
|-valign=top
|cast – cast – castbroadcast – broadcast – broadcastdowncast – downcast – downcastforecast – forecast – forecastmiscast – miscast – miscastovercast – overcast – overcastpodcast – podcast – podcastprecast – precast – precastrecast – recast – recastsimulcast – simulcast – simulcasttelecast – telecast – telecasttypecast – typecast – typecastundercast – undercast – undercastupcast – upcast – upcastwebcast – webcast – webcast| Weak Norse loanword with coalescence of dentals. Many of the prefixed forms can also take -ed.
|-valign=top
| catch – caught – caught| Weak, French loanword conjugated perhaps by analogy with teach–taught; regular forms are now dialectal.
|-valign=top
| chide – chode/chid/chided – chidden/chid/chided| Strong, class 1 (or regular)
|-valign=top
|choose – chose – chosenmischoose – mischose – mischosen| Strong, class 2
|-valign=top
|clad – clad – clad|Developed from clad, the past form of clothe (see below).
|-valign=top
|cleave [meaning to split] – cleft/clove/cleaved – cleft/cloven/cleaved| Strong, class 2, sometimes switching to weak with vowel shortening. When meaning "adhere" the verb is regular.
|-valign=top
|cling – clung – clung| Strong, class 3
|-valign=top
|clothe – clad/clothed – clad/clothedoverclothe – overclad/overclothed – overclad/overclothedunclothe – unclad/unclothed – unclad/unclothedunderclothe – underclad/underclothed – underclad/underclothed| Weak; the regular clothed is from OE claþian, while clad (weak with coalescence of dentals) is from OE clæþan (both OE verbs having similar meaning).
|-valign=top
|comb – combed – combed/kempt|
|-valign=top
|come – came – comeforthcome – forthcame – forthcomeovercome – overcame – overcome(see also under become)
| Strong, class 4
|-valign=top
|cost [intransitive sense] – cost/costed – cost/costed| Weak French loanword with coalescence of dentals. Regular when meaning "calculate the cost of".
|-valign=top
|creep – crept/creeped – crept/creeped| Originally strong, class 2; switched to weak with vowel shortening (or regular)
|-valign=top
|cut – cut – cutclearcut – clearcut – clearcutcrosscut – crosscut – crosscutintercut – intercut – intercutrecut – recut – recutundercut – undercut – undercut| Weak with coalescence of dentals
|-valign=top
|dare (dares/dare) – dared/durst – dared/durst| Preterite-present, now most often regular except in the use of dare in place of dares in some contexts. See English modal verbs
|-valign=top
|deal – dealt – dealtmisdeal – misdealt – misdealtredeal – redealt – redealt| Weak, class 1, with vowel shortening and devoiced ending
|-valign=top
|dig – dug – dugunderdig – underdug – underdug| Originally weak; past form dug developed by analogy with stick–stuck|-valign=top
|dive – dived/dove – dived/dove| Weak, the alternative dove (found mainly in American usage) arising by analogy with strong verbs
|-valign=top
|do (does ) – did – donebedo (bedoes) – bedid – bedonemisdo (misdoes) – misdid – misdoneoutdo (outdoes) – outdid – outdoneoverdo (overdoes) – overdid – overdoneredo (redoes) – redid – redoneunderdo (underdoes) – underdid – underdoneundo (undoes) – undid – undone| Irregular since Proto-Germanic: past tense formed by reduplication. Past participle from Old English gedon. Related to deed.
|- valign="top"
| dow – dowed/dought – dowed/dought| Related to doughty.
|-valign=top
|draw – drew – drawnbedraw – bedrew – bedrawndowndraw – downdrew – downdrawnoutdraw – outdrew – outdrawnoverdraw – overdrew – overdrawnredraw – redrew – redrawnunderdraw – underdrew – underdrawnupdraw – updrew – updrawnwithdraw – withdrew – withdrawn| Strong, class 6; related to draft/draught|-valign=top
|dream – dreamed/dreamt – dreamed/dreamtbedream – bedreamed/bedreamt – bedreamed/bedreamt| Weak with vowel shortening and devoiced ending (or regular)
|-valign=top
|dress – dressed – dressed| Weak with alternative (archaic) spelling
|-valign=top
|drink – drank – drunk| Strong, class 3; related to drench|-valign=top
|drive – drove – drivenbedrive – bedrove – bedrivenoverdrive – overdrove – overdriventest-drive – test-drove – test-drivenunderdrive – underdrove – underdriven| Strong, class 1; related to drift|-valign=top
|dwell – dwelt/dwelled – dwelt/dwelledbedwell – bedwelt/bedwelled – bedwelt/bedwelledoutdwell – outdwelt/outdwelled – outdwelt/outdwelled| Weak with devoiced ending (or regular)
|-valign=top
|earn – earned/earnt – earned/earnt| Weak, class 2 with devoiced ending (or regular)
|-valign=top
|eat – ate – eatenforfret – forfretted – forfretted/forfrettenfret – fretted/frate – fretted/frettenouteat – outate – outeatenovereat – overate – overeatenundereat – underate – undereaten| Strong, class 5. Past tense usually , sometimes  in British English.
|-valign=top
|fall – fell – fallenbefall – befell – befallen| Strong, class 7
|-valign=top
|feed – fed – fedbottle-feed – bottle-fed – bottle-fedbreastfeed – breastfed – breastfedforce-feed – force-fed – force-fedhand-feed – hand-fed – hand-fedmisfeed – misfed – misfedoverfeed – overfed – overfedself-feed – self-fed – self-fedspoon-feed – spoon-fed – spoon-fedunderfeed – underfed – underfed| Weak, class 1, with vowel shortening and coalescence of dentals
|-valign=top
|feel – felt – feltforefeel – forefelt – forefelt| Weak, class 1, with vowel shortening and devoiced ending
|-valign=top
|fight – fought – foughtbefight – befought – befoughtoutfight – outfought – outfought| Strong, class 3
|-valign=top
|find – found – foundrefind – refound – refound| Strong, class 3
|-valign=top
|fit – fitted/fit – fitted/fitmisfit – misfitted/misfit – misfitted/misfit| Weak with coalescence of dentals
|-valign=top
|flee – fled – fled| Originally strong, class 2, switched to weak with vowel shortening  
|-valign=top
|fling – flung – flung| By analogy with strong, class 3
|-valign=top
|fly – flew – flownoutfly – outflew – outflownoverfly – overflew – overflowntest-fly – test-flew – test-flown| Strong, class 2. Regular when used for hitting a fly ball in baseball.
|-valign=top
|forbid – forbid/forbade/forbad – forbidden| Strong, class 5
|-valign=top
|forget – forgot – forgotten| Strong, class 5
|-valign=top
|forsake – forsook – forsaken| Strong, class 6
|-valign=top
|freeze – froze – frozenquick-freeze – quick-froze – quick-frozenrefreeze – refroze – refrozenunfreeze – unfroze – unfrozen| Strong, class 2
|-valign=top
|get – got – got/gottenbeget – begot/begat – begot/begottenforget – forgot – forgotten| Strong, class 5. Past participle is got in British usage (except in fossilized phrases such as "ill-gotten"), and gotten in American (but see have got).
|-valign=top
|gild – gilded/gilt – gilded/gilt| Weak, class 1, with coalescence of dentals and devoiced ending (or regular)
|-valign=top
|give – gave – givenforgive – forgave – forgivenmisgive – misgave – misgivenovergive – overgave – overgiven| Strong, class 5
|-valign=top
|glide – glided/glid – glided/glid| Originally Strong, class 1, but now often regular.
|-valign=top
|go – went – goneforego – forewent – foregoneforgo – forwent – forgoneundergo – underwent – undergone| Suppletive. See article on the verb go.
|-valign=top
|grind – ground – ground| Strong, class 3
|-valign=top
|grow – grew – grownoutgrow – outgrew – outgrownovergrow – overgrew – overgrownregrow – regrew – regrown| Strong, class 7
|-valign=top
|hang – hung/hanged – hung/hangedoverhang – overhung – overhung| Strong, class 7. Regularized alternative hanged was influenced by OE causative hangian, and is used chiefly for hanging as a means of execution.
|-valign=top
|have (has) – had – had | Weak; had results from contraction, from OE hæfde. Third person present has also a result of contraction.
|-valign=top
|hear – heard – heardbehear – beheard – beheardforehear – foreheard – foreheardmishear – misheard – misheardouthear – outheard – outheardoverhear – overheard – overheardrehear – reheard – reheardunhear – unheard – unheard| Weak, class 1, originally with vowel shortening (the modern pronunciation of heard in RP has the long vowel )
|-valign=top
|help – helped – helped| Originally strong, class 3, but now regular.
|-valign=top
|hew – hewed – hewed/hewn| Strong, class 7 (or regular)
|-valign=top
|hide – hid – hidden| Weak with vowel shortening and coalescence of dentals, influenced by strong verbs
|-valign=top
|hit – hit – hitmishit – mishit – mishitoverhit – overhit – overhitunderhit – underhit – underhit| Weak with coalescence of dentals
|-valign=top
|hoist – hoisted/hoist – hoisted/hoist| Weak, hoist was originally the past form of the now archaic verb hoise|-valign=top
|hold – held – heldbehold – beheld – behelduphold – upheld – upheldwithhold – withheld – withheld| Strong, class 7
|-valign=top
|hurt – hurt – hurt| Weak French loanword with coalescence of dentals
|-valign=top
|keep – kept – keptmiskeep – miskept – miskeptoverkeep – overkept – overkeptunderkeep – underkept – underkept| Weak, class 1, with vowel shortening
|-valign=top
|ken – kenned/kent – kenned/kentbeken – bekenned/bekent – bekenned/bekentforeken – forekenned/forekent – forekenned/forekentmisken – miskenned/miskent – miskenned/miskentoutken – outkenned/outkent – outkenned/outkent| Northern and Scottish dialect word. Weak with devoiced ending (or regular)
|-valign=top
|kneel – knelt/kneeled – knelt/kneeled | Weak with vowel shortening and devoiced ending (or regular)
|-valign=top
|knit – knit/knitted – knit/knittedbeknit – beknit/beknitted – beknit/beknittedhand-knit – hand-knit/hand-knitted – hand-knit/hand-knitted| Weak, class 1, with coalescence of dentals (or regular); related to knot|-valign=top
|know – knew – known| Strong, class 7
|-valign=top
|lade – laded – laden/ladedoverlade – overladed – overladen/overladed| Strong, class 6, often regularized (past participle laden is common adjectivally)
|-valign=top
|lay – laid – laidbelay – belaid – belaidinlay – inlaid – inlaidmislay – mislaid – mislaidoverlay – overlaid – overlaidwaylay – waylaid – waylaid| Weak, irregular in spelling only
|-valign=top
|lead – led – ledmislead – misled – misledofflead – offled – offledonlead – onled – onledoutlead – outled – outledoverlead – overled – overledunderlead – underled – underled| Weak, class 1, with vowel shortening and coalescence of dentals
|-valign=top
|lean – leaned/leant – leaned/leant| Weak with vowel shortening and devoiced ending (or regular)
|-valign=top
|leap – leaped/leapt – leaped/leapt| Originally strong, class 7, now weak with vowel shortening (or regular)
|-valign=top
|learn – learned/learnt – learned/learntmislearn – mislearned/mislearnt – mislearned/mislearntoverlearn – overlearned/overlearnt – overlearned/overlearntrelearn – relearned/relearnt – relearned/relearntunlearn – unlearned/unlearnt – unlearned/unlearnt| Weak, class 2, with devoiced ending (or regular)
|-valign=top
|leave – left – left| Weak, class 1, with vowel shortening and devoiced ending
|-valign=top
|lend – lent – lent| Weak with coalescence of dentals and devoiced ending
|-valign=top
|let – let – letsublet – sublet – subletunderlet – underlet – underlet| Strong, class 7
|-valign=top
|lie – lay – lainoverlie – overlay – overlainunderlie – underlay – underlain| Strong, class 5. Regular in the meaning "tell an untruth".
|-valign=top
|light – lit/lighted – lit/lightedalight – alit/alighted – alit/alightedbacklight – backlit/backlighted – backlit/backlightedgreen-light – green-lit/green-lighted – green-lit/green-lightedrelight – relit/relighted – relit/relighted| Weak, class 1, with vowel shortening and coalescence of dentals (or regular)
|-valign=top
|lose – lost – lost| Originally strong, class 2, now weak with vowel shortening and devoiced ending
|-valign=top
|make – made – maderemake – remade – remadeunmake – unmade – unmade| Weak; made formed by contraction from "maked"
|-valign=top
|may – might – (none)
| Preterite-present, defective. See English modal verbs
|-valign=top
|mean – meant – meant| Weak, class 1, with vowel shortening and devoiced ending
|-valign=top
|meet – met – met| Weak, class 1, with vowel shortening and coalescence of dentals
|-valign=top
|melt – melted – melted/molten| Strong, class 3. Now regularized, but molten survives in adjectival uses.
|-valign=top
|mix – mixed – mixed| Weak, regular, with alternative (mostly archaic) spelling
|-valign=top
|mow – mowed – mowed/mown| Strong, class 7. Now regularized in past tense and sometimes in past participle.
|-valign=top
|must – (no other forms)
| Defective; originally a preterite. See English modal verbs
|-valign=top
|need (needs/need) – needed – needed| Weak, regular except in the use of need in place of needs in some contexts, by analogy with can, must, etc. See English modal verbs
|-valign=top
|ought – (no other forms)
| Defective; originally a preterite. See English modal verbs
|-valign=top
|pay – paid – paidoverpay – overpaid – overpaidprepay – prepaid – prepaidrepay – repaid – repaidunderpay – underpaid – underpaid| Weak, irregular in spelling only. 
|-valign=top
|pen – penned/pent – penned/pent| Weak with devoiced ending, but usually regular; pent is sometimes used when the verb has the meaning "to enclose", and mainly adjectivally
|-valign=top
|plead – pled/pleaded – pled/pleaded| Weak French loanword with vowel shortening and coalescence of dentals. In North America, this verb is usually irregular.
|-valign=top
|prove – proved – proved/provenreprove – reproved – reproved/reproven| Weak French loanword with the alternative past participle proven by analogy with some strong verbs
|-valign=top
|put – put – putinput – input – inputoutput – output – output| Weak with coalescence of dentals. 
|-valign=top
|bequeath – bequeathed/bequethed/bequoth/bequod – bequeathed/bequethed/bequoth/bequethen| Strong, class 5. Past tense quoth is literary or archaic; other parts of that verb are obsolete. Bequeath is normally regularized in -ed.
|-valign=top
|quit – quit/quitted – quit/quitted| Weak French loanword with coalescence of dentals (or regular)
|-valign=top
|read  – read  – read lipread – lipread – lipreadmisread – misread – misreadproofread – proofread – proofreadreread – reread – rereadsight-read – sight-read – sight-read| Weak, class 1, with vowel shortening and coalescence of dentals
|-valign=top
|reave – reaved/reft – reaved/reftbereave – bereaved/bereft – bereaved/bereft| Weak, class 2, with vowel shortening and devoiced ending. The verb bereave is usually regular, but bereft survives as past participle, with distinct meanings.
|-valign=top
|rend – rent – rent| Weak, class 1, with coalescence of dentals and devoiced ending
|-valign=top
|rid – rid/ridded – rid/ridden/ridded| Weak with coalescence of dentals, or regular; ridden by analogy with strong verbs.
|-valign=top
|ride – rode – riddenoutride – outrode – outriddenoverride – overrode – overridden| Strong, class 1
|-valign=top
|ring – rang – rung| By analogy with strong, class 3. Regular when meaning "surround", etc.
|-valign=top
|rise – rose – risenarise – arose – arisenuprise – uprose – uprisen| Strong, class 1
|-valign=top
|rive – rived/rove – rived/riven|From Old Norse, originally followed pattern of strong class 1, later regularized. Now rarely used.
|-valign=top
|run – ran – runoutrun – outran – outrunoverrun – overran – overrunrerun – reran – rerununderrun – underran – underrun| Strong, class 3
|-valign=top
|saw – sawed – sawed/sawn| Weak; sawn by analogy with strong verbs
|-valign=top
|say (says ) – said – saidmissay – missaid – missaidsoothsay – soothsaid – soothsaid| Weak, with vowel shortening in said  and in the third person present says 
|-valign=top
|see – saw – seenforesee – foresaw – foreseenmissee – missaw – misseenoversee – oversaw – overseensightsee – sightsaw – sightseenundersee – undersaw – underseen| Strong, class 5
|-valign=top
|seek – sought – soughtbeseek – besought – besought| Weak, class 1, subclass (ii), with Rückumlaut and Germanic spirant law
|-valign=top
|sell – sold – soldoutsell – outsold – outsoldoversell – oversold – oversoldresell – resold – resoldundersell – undersold – undersoldupsell – upsold – upsold| Weak, class 1, subclass (ii), with Rückumlaut; related to sale|-valign=top
|send – sent – sentmissend – missent – missentresend – resent – resent| Weak, class 1, with coalescence of dentals
|-valign=top
|set – set – setbeset – beset – besetoffset – offset – offsetpreset – preset – presetreset – reset – resetupset – upset – upset| Weak, class 1, with coalescence of dentals
|-valign=top
|sew – sewed – sewn/sewedhandsew – handsewed – handsewn/handsewedoversew – oversewed – oversewn/oversewed| Weak; sewn by analogy with strong verbs
|-valign=top
|shake – shook – shakenovershake – overshook – overshaken| Strong, class 6
|-valign=top
|shall – should – (none)
| Preterite-present; defective. See English modal verbs, and shall and will
|-valign=top
|shear – sheared/shore – shorn/sheared | Strong, class 4 (or regular)
|-valign=top
|shed – shed – shed| Strong, class 7
|-valign=top
|shine – shone/shined – shone/shined| Strong, class 1
|-valign=top
|shit – shit/shitted/shat – shit/shitted/shatshite – shited/shit – shited/shit| Strong, class 1. The form shite is chiefly Scottish and Irish.
|-valign=top
|shoe – shod/shoed – shodden/shod/shoedreshoe – reshod/reshoed – reshodden/reshod/reshoed| Weak with vowel shortening (or regular); shodden by analogy with strong verbs
|-valign=top
|shoot – shot – shotmisshoot – misshot – misshotovershoot – overshot – overshotreshoot – reshot – reshotundershoot – undershot – undershot| Strong, class 2
|-valign=top
|show – showed – shown/showedreshow – reshowed – reshown| Weak, with participle shown perhaps by analogy with sown (from sow)
|-valign=top
|shrink – shrank/shrunk – shrunk/shrunkenovershrink – overshrank/overshrunk – overshrunk/overshrunken| Strong, class 3; shrunken is mostly used adjectivally
|-valign=top
|shut – shut – shutreshut – reshut – reshut| Weak, class 1, with coalescence of dentals
|-valign=top
|sing – sang – sungresing – resang – resung| Strong, class 3
|-valign=top
|sink – sank/sunk – sunk/sunken| Strong, class 3. The form sunken appears in some adjectival uses.
|-valign=top
|sit – sat – satbabysit – babysat – babysathousesit – housesat – housesatresit – resat – resat| Strong, class 5
|-valign=top
|slay – slew/slayed – slain/slayed| Strong, class 6 (or regular)
|-valign=top
|sleep – slept – sleptoversleep – overslept – oversleptundersleep – underslept – underslept| Originally strong, class 7, now weak with vowel shortening
|-valign=top
|slide – slid – slid/sliddenbackslide – backslid – backslid/backsliddenoverslide – overslid – overslid/overslidden| Strong, class 1
|-valign=top
|sling – slung – slung| Strong, class 3
|-valign=top
|slink – slunk/slinked/slank – slunk/slinked/slank|Strong, class 3
|-valign=top
|slit – slit – slit/slitten| Strong, class 1
|-valign=top
|smell – smelled/smelt – smelled/smelt| Weak with devoiced ending (or regular)
|-valign=top
|smite – smote/smit – smitten/smitted| Strong, class 1. Largely archaic; smitten is quite commonly used adjectivally.
|-valign=top
|sneak – sneaked/snuck – sneaked/snuck| Weak, alternative form snuck (chiefly American) by analogy with strong verbs
|-valign=top
|sow – sowed – sown/sowed| Strong, class 7, with weak past tense sowed|-valign=top
|speak – spoke – spokenbespeak – bespoke – bespoken*forespeak – forespoke – forespoken*forspeak – forspoke – forspokenmisspeak – misspoke – misspoken| Strong, class 5
|-valign=top
|speed – sped/speeded – sped/speeded| Weak, class 1, with vowel shortening and coalescence of dentals (or regular)
|-valign=top
|spell – spelled/spelt – spelled/speltmisspell – misspelled/misspelt – misspelled/misspelt| Weak with devoiced ending (or regular)
|-valign=top
|spend – spent – spentmisspend – misspent – misspentoutspend – outspent – outspentoverspend – overspent – overspent| Weak with coalescence of dentals
|-valign=top
|spill – spilled/spilt – spilled/spiltoverspill – overspilled/overspilt – overspilled/overspilt| Weak with devoiced ending (or regular)
|-valign=top
|spin – spun – spunoutspin – outspun – outspun| Strong, class 3
|-valign=top
|spit – spat/spit – spat/spit| Weak with coalescence of dentals (for past form spit, which is common in America), or spat by analogy with strong verbs. (In the meaning of roast on a spit, the verb is regular.)
|-valign=top
|split – split – split| Weak with coalescence of dentals
|-valign=top
|spoil – spoiled/spoilt – spoiled/spoilt| | Weak French loanword with devoiced ending (or regular)
|-valign=top
|spread – spread – spreadoutspread – outspread – outspreadoverspread – overspread – overspreadunderspread – underspread – underspread| Weak with coalescence of dentals
|-valign=top
|spring – sprang/sprung – sprung/*spranghandspring – handsprang/handsprung – handsprung/*handsprang| Strong, class 3
|-valign=top
|stand – stood – stoodforstand – forstood – forstoodmisunderstand – misunderstood – misunderstoodoverstand – overstood – overstoodunderstand – understood – understoodupstand – upstood – upstoodwithstand – withstood – withstood| Strong, class 6
|-valign=top
|stave – stove/staved – stove/staved/stoven| Originally weak; irregular forms developed by analogy with strong verbs.
|-valign=top
|steal – stole – stolen| Strong, class 4
|-valign=top
|stick – stuck – stuck| Originally weak, irregular forms by analogy with strong verb class 3
|-valign=top
|sting – stung – stung| Strong, class 3
|-valign=top
|stink – stank/stunk – stunk| Strong, class 3
|-valign=top
|strew – strewed – strewn/strewedbestrew – bestrewed – bestrewn/bestrewedoverstrew – overstrewed – overstrewn/overstrewed| Originally weak, irregular forms by analogy with strong verbs
|-valign=top
|stride – strode – striddenbestride – bestrode – bestriddenoutstride – outstrode – outstriddenoverstride – overstrode – overstridden| Strong, class 1
|-valign=top
|strike – struck – struck/strickenoverstrike – overstruck – overstruck/overstricken| Strong, class 1. The form stricken is limited to certain adjectival and specialist uses.
|-valign=top
|string – strung/*stringed – strung/*stringedhamstring – hamstrung/*hamstringed – hamstrung/*hamstringedoverstring – overstrung/*overstringed – overstrung/*overstringed| Originally weak, irregular forms developed by analogy with strong verbs
|-valign=top
|strip – stripped/stript – stripped/stript|
|-valign=top
|strive – strove/strived – striven/strivedoutstrive – outstrove – outstrivenoverstrive – overstrove – overstriven| Strong, class 1 (or regularized)
|-valign=top
|swear – swore – swornforswear – forswore – forswornoutswear – outswore – outsworn| Strong, class 6
|-valign=top
|sweat – sweated/sweat – sweated/sweat| Weak, usually regular, possible past form sweat with coalescence of dentals
|-valign=top
|sweep – swept – sweptupsweep – upswept – upswept| Weak with vowel shortening. Replaced OE strong class 7 verb swápan, with the same meaning, but the form is not a regular development from it.
|-valign=top
|swell – swelled/swole – swollen/swelled| Strong, class 3, with regularized forms
|-valign=top
|swim – swam/*swum – swumoutswim – outswam/*outswum – outswum| Strong, class 3
|-valign=top
|swing – swang/swung – swungoverswing – overswang/overswung – overswung| Strong, class 3
|-valign=top
|take – took – takenbetake – betook – betakenmistake – mistook – mistakenovertake – overtook – overtakenpartake – partook – partakenretake – retook – retakenundertake – undertook – undertaken*uptake – uptook – uptaken*withtake – withtook – withtaken| Strong, class 6
|-valign=top
|teach – taught – taught| Weak, class 1, subclass (ii), with Rückumlaut and Germanic spirant law
|-valign=top
|tear – tore – tornuptear – uptore – uptorn| Strong, class 4
|- valign=top
| *tee – teed/tow – teed/town betee – beteed/betow – beteed/betown fortee – forteed/fortow – forteed/fortown| 
|-valign=top
|tell – told – toldforetell – foretold – foretoldforthtell – forthtold – forthtoldmistell – mistold – mistold| Weak, class 1, subclass (ii), with Rückumlaut; related to tale|-valign=top
|think – thought – thoughtoutthink – outthought – outthoughtrethink – rethought – rethought| Weak, class 1, subclass (ii), with Rückumlaut and Germanic spirant law
|-valign=top
|thrive – throve/thrived/*thrave – thriven/thrived| Of Old Norse origin; followed strong class 1 (now archaic) or weak (regular) pattern
|-valign=top
|throw – threw – thrownoutthrow – outthrew – outthrownoverthrow – overthrew – overthrownunderthrow – underthrew – underthrownupthrow – upthrew – upthrown| Strong, class 7
|-valign=top
|thrust – thrust/*thrusted – thrust/*thrustedoutthrust – outthrust – outthrust| Weak, with coalescence of dentals (or regular)
|-valign=top
|tread – trod – trodden/trodretread – retrod/*retread/*retreaded/*retrodden – retrodden/retrod/*retread/*retreaded| Strong, class 5 (or regularized)
|-valign=top
|vex – vexed – vexed| Regular, with alternative (archaic) spelling
|-valign=top
|wake – woke/waked – woken/wakedawake – awoke – awoken| Strong, class 6
|-valign=top
|wear – weared/wore – weared/wornoutwear – outweared/outwore – outweared/outwornoverwear – overweared/overwore – overweared/overworn| Originally weak, fell into a strong pattern by analogy with bear|-valign=top
|weave – wove – woveninterweave – interwove – interwoven| Strong, class 7
|-valign=top
|wed – wed/wedded – wed/weddedmiswed – miswed/miswedded – miswed/misweddedrewed – rewed/rewedded – rewed/rewedded| Weak, class 2, with coalescence of dentals (or regular)
|-valign=top
|weep – wept/weeped – wept/weeped| Originally strong, class 7, now weak with vowel shortening (or regular)
|-valign=top
|wend – wended/went – wended/went| Weak, class 1, once with coalescence of dentals and devoiced ending, but now regular; went is used as the past of go|-valign=top
|wet – wet/wetted – wet/wettedoverwet – overwet/overwetted – overwet/overwetted| Weak with coalescence of dentals (or regular)
|-valign=top
|will – would – (none)
| Preterite-present, defective. See English modal verbs, and shall and will. (In non-auxiliary uses the verb is regular.)
|-valign=top
|win – won – won| Strong, class 3
|-valign=top
|wind – wound – woundrewind – rewound – rewoundunwind – unwound – unwound| Strong, class 3. (The identically spelt verb wind , with meanings connected with air flow and breathlessness, is regular.)
|-valign=top
|work – worked/wrought – worked/wrought| Weak, now regular, formerly with Rückumlaut and metathesis of r and o|-valign=top
|wreak – wreaked/wrought – wreaked/wrought|Weak, usually regular; wrought (which is in fact from work) has come sometimes to be identified with this verb (perhaps by analogy with seek–sought). 
|-valign=top
|wring – wrang/wrung – wrung| Strong, class 3
|-valign=top
|write – wrote – writtencowrite – cowrote – cowrittenghostwrite – ghostwrote – ghostwrittenhandwrite – handwrote – handwrittenmiswrite – miswrote – miswrittenoverwrite – overwrote – overwrittenrewrite – rewrote – rewrittenunderwrite – underwrote – underwritten|Strong, class 1
|-valign=top
|writhe – writhed – writhed| Strong, class 1, now regularized
|-valign=top
|zinc – zinced/zinked/zincked – zinced/zinked/zincked| Regular, with spelling complications because of the final letter C
|}

Present tense irregular verbs

Though the list of verbs irregular in the preterite or past participle is long, the list of irregular present tense verbs is very short. Excepting modal verbs like "shall", "will", and "can" that do not inflect at all in the present tense, there are only four of them (only two if pronunciation is ignored), not counting compounds including them:
be: I am, thou art, you are, he is, we are, they are. The contracted/reduced forms, used in unstressed positions and in particular as auxiliary verbs, are as follows: I’m, you’re, he’s, we’re, they’re.
The reduced forms of the verb do are pronounced /du/, /də/, /d/, or /dəz/, /dz/ for does and usually appear only in questions. The contracted forms of do are used only in the negative: I do not = I don't, you do not = you don't, he does not = he doesn't, we do not = we don't, they do not = they don't.
have: I have, you have, he has, we have, they have. If used as an auxiliary verb in the present perfect, past perfect and future perfect, its contracted forms can be used: I’ve, you’ve, he’s, we’ve, they’ve.
say (and compounds such as "gainsay" and "naysay"): I say, you say, he says, we say, they say'' where "says" has the standard pronunciation  (instead of ) in contrast to the  used for the infinitive and other present tense forms.

References

External links
 Wiktionary's category of English irregular verbs
 Complete List of 638 English Irregular Verbs with their forms in different tenses.
 Mind Our English: Strong and weak by Ralph Berry
 English Irregular Verb List A comprehensive list of English irregular verbs, including their base form, past simple, past participle, 3rd person singular, and the present participle / gerund.
Database of all irregular verbs with complete conjugation and audio.

Irregular Verbs
Linguistics lists
Irregular Verbs